Michela Torrenti (born 10 August 1977) is an Italian judoka.

Achievements

References
 

1977 births
Living people
Italian female judoka
Judoka at the 2008 Summer Olympics
Olympic judoka of Italy
Judoka of Fiamme Oro
Place of birth missing (living people)